Tiškevičiai Palace is a former residential palace in Vilnius Old Town, near the intersection of Trakų and Pylimo streets. 

There have been masonry buildings on the site since the 15th century. The Baroque mansion was designed by Laurynas Gucevičius for the Karpiai  noble family in the 18th century. 

The palace owes its name to the Tiškevičiai (Tyszkiewicz) noble family who commissioned Tomas Tyšeckis to reconstruct the building in 1840.

The former palace belongs to the Vilnius Gediminas Technical University and houses the Faculty of Architecture.

References

External links 
 Vilnius Gediminas Technical University

Palaces in Vilnius
Classicism architecture in Lithuania
Houses completed in 1840